This is a list in alphabetical order of cricketers who have played for Yorkshire County Cricket Club in top-class matches since the club was founded in 1863. Like the Yorkshire county teams formed by earlier organisations, essentially the old Sheffield Cricket Club, the county club has always held first-class status. It has been a List A team since the beginning of limited overs cricket in 1963; and a top-class Twenty20 team since the inauguration of the Twenty20 Cup in 2003. 

The details are the player's usual name followed by the years in which he was active as a Yorkshire player and then his name is given as it usually appears on match scorecards. Note that many players represented other top-class teams besides Yorkshire. Names of those players who have represented England in Test cricket are preceded by the § symbol. Names of overseas players (i.e., if not England-qualified) are preceded by their national team's flag icon (e.g.). All players whose Yorkshire career ended in or before 2019 are sourced to CricketArchive. Players who represented the club in 2020 are in bold and sourced to the CricketArchive data at the end of that season.

The list excludes Second XI and other players who did not play for the club's first team; and players whose first team appearances were in minor matches only. Players who represented the county before 1863 are included if they also played for the county club but excluded if not. All players known to have represented the county before the formation of the county club are included in List of Sheffield Cricket Club players.

A

B

C

D

E 
 Wilson Earnshaw (1890–1896) : W. Earnshaw
 David Eastwood (1870–1877) : D. Eastwood
 Ronald Eckersley (1945) : R. Eckersley
 Frederick Elam (1900–1902) : F. W. Elam
  Matthew Elliott (2002) : M. T. G. Elliott
 John Ellis (1887–1892) : J. E. Ellis
 Samuel Ellis (1880) : S. Ellis
 John Elms (1905) : J. E. Elms
 Christopher Elstub (2000–2002) : C. J. Elstub
 § Tom Emmett (1866–1888) : T. Emmett

F

G

H

I 
 Roger Iddison (1863–1876) : R. Iddison
 § Ray Illingworth (1951–1968; 1982–1983) : R. Illingworth
  Imran Tahir (2007) : Imran Tahir
 Peter Ingham (1979–1981) : P. G. Ingham
 John Inglis (1999–2000) : J. W. Inglis
  Inzamam-ul-Haq (2007) : Inzamam-ul-Haq

J

K

L

M

N 
  Naved-ul-Hasan (2008–2009) : Naved-ul-Hasan
 John Naylor (1953) : J. E. Naylor
 John Newstead (1903–1913) : J. T. Newstead
 Tony Nicholson (1962–1975) : A. G. Nicholson
 Neil Nicholson (1988–1989) : N. G. Nicholson

O 
 William Oates (1874–1875) : W. Oates
 William Oates (1956) : W. F. Oates
 § Chris Old (1966–1982) : C. M. Old
 Stephen Oldham (1974–1992) : S. Oldham
 Edgar Oldroyd (1910–1931) : E. Oldroyd
 Duanne Olivier (2019–2020) : D. Olivier
 Charles Oyston (1900–1909) : C. Oyston

P

R

S

T

U 
 Charles Ullathorne (1868–1875) : C. E. Ullathorne
 § George Ulyett (1873–1893) : G. Ulyett
 John Usher (1888) : J. Usher

V 
 Jack van Geloven (1955) : J. van Geloven
 § Michael Vaughan (1993–2009) : M. P. Vaughan
 Harry Verelst (1868–1869) : H. W. Verelst
 § Hedley Verity (1930–1939) : H. Verity

W

Y 
 § Norman Yardley (1936–1955) : N. W. D. Yardley
 James Yeadon (1888) : J. Yeadon
  Younis Khan (2007) : Younis Khan

See also
 List of Sheffield Cricket Club players
 List of Yorkshire County Cricket Club captains

Notes

References
 

Players

Yorkshire
Cricketers